Abeywickrama or Abeywickrema is a Sinhalese surname.

Notable people
 Don Pedris Francis Abeywickrama (1886-1966), Ceylonese writer and poet
 Dinesh Abeywickrama (born 1983), Sri Lankan businessman
 Harsha Abeywickrama (born 1960), Sri Lankan aviator
 Henry Abeywickrema (1905-1976), Ceylonese politician
 Joe Abeywickrama (1927–2011), Sri Lankan actor
 Keerthilatha Abeywickrama, Sri Lankan politician
 Keerthisena Abeywickrama (1933-1987), Sri Lankan politician
 Sanduni Abeywickrema (born 1982), Sri Lankan cricketer
 Simon Abeywickrema (1903-1948), Ceylonese politician
 Sumanadasa Abeywickrama (1928-2006), Sri Lankan politician

See also
 
 

Sinhalese surnames